Basford is a surname. Notable people with the surname include:

 Bill Basford (1930-2022), American politician and lawyer
 Harry Elsworth Basford (1808-1974), American farmer and politician
 Jack Basford, English footballer
 Johanna Basford (b. 1983), Scottish illustrator
 Kathleen Basford (1916–1998), British botanist
 Kaye Basford, Australian statistician and plant geneticist
 Matthew Basford, guitarist for the band Yankee Grey
 Ron Basford (1932–2005), a Canadian politician

See also 
 Bassford

References 

English-language surnames
fr:Basford